Pursued is a 1934 American drama film directed by Louis King and starring Rosemary Ames, Victor Jory and Russell Hardie. Produced and distributed by Fox Film Corporation. It is based on a story from the Saturday Evening Post, The Painted Lady, by Larry Evans. It was previously filmed by Fox as a silent When a Man Sees Red in 1917.

Synopsis
A San Francisco man inherits a plantation in British North Borneo from his uncle. He clashes with a neighbouring plantation owner who organizes an attack on him. He is nursed back health by Mona a nightclub singer.

Cast

References

External links
 
 

1934 films
1934 drama films
American black-and-white films
Films based on short fiction
Films directed by Louis King
American drama films
Fox Film films
1930s English-language films
Remakes of American films
Films set in Borneo
1930s American films